Goh Swee Swee (born 1 June 1986) is a Singaporean footballer who plays for Hougang United in the S-League.

Club career

Goh started his S-league career with Gombak United but only played 1 game for the Bulls before joining Home United in 2007. At that time, the Protectors offered him a S.League contract while he was still on a Prime League contract with Gombak. He immediately repaid the favour to the Protectors by scoring a 90th-minute winner against Liaoning Guangyuan in his debut on 16 March 2007.

However, Goh found it hard to start upfront with Home United having the likes of Peres de Oliveira, Indra Sahdan and Ludovick Takam in their ranks. As a result, he was often deployed as a rightback or right midfielder.

Goh was then transferred to the Courts Young Lions in 2008 and he played mostly as a midfielder for the Young Lions in the S.League.

Following his stint with the Young Lions, Goh had a brief spell at Balestier Khalsa in 2010 before switching over to his current club, Woodlands Wellington with fellow tiger, midfielder Han Yiguang in the 2011 pre-season. Goh is the second top scorer for Woodlands for the past 2 seasons, netting 5 goals after 31 appearances in 2011 and 4 goals in 23 appearances in 2012.

Goh achieved a personal milestone when he led Woodlands Wellington out during their match against Home United at Bishan Stadium as the team captain in the first time in his career on 5 March 2013.

Goh signed for 2016 Singapore National Football League champions Eunos Crescent for the 2017 NFL season.

Career statistics

Goh Swee Swee's Profile

All numbers encased in brackets signify substitute appearances.

International career

Goh was called up to the national team on a couple of occasions but he has yet to appear for the Lions in an international match.

References

External links
 Profile of Goh Swee Swee

1986 births
Singaporean footballers
Living people
Singapore Premier League players
Singaporean people of Hokkien descent
Singaporean sportspeople of Chinese descent
Balestier Khalsa FC players
Gombak United FC players
Woodlands Wellington FC players
Home United FC players
Young Lions FC players
Association football forwards